The Ambassador of the United Kingdom to Portugal is the United Kingdom's foremost diplomatic representative in the Portuguese Republic, and head of the UK's diplomatic mission in Portugal.

For ambassadors from the Court of St James's to Portugal before 1707, see List of ambassadors of the Kingdom of England to Portugal. For Ambassadors from 1707 to 1800, see List of ambassadors of Great Britain to Portugal.

List of heads of mission

Envoys of the United Kingdom to Portugal
1800–1802: John Hookham Frere Envoy Extraordinary and Minister Plenipotentiary at the Court of His Highness the Prince Regent of Portugal
1802–1806: Lord Robert FitzGerald Envoy Extraordinary and Minister Plenipotentiary to the Court of Lisbon
1806: Lord Rosslyn and Lord St Vincent, extraordinary envoys
1806: Viscount Strangford chargé d'affaires

Envoy Extraordinary and Minister Plenipotentiary
1807–1808: Viscount Strangford
1808–1810: John Charles Villiers
1810–1814: Sir Charles Stuart
1814–1817: Thomas Sydenham
1817–1820: Sir Edward Thornton
1820–1823: Edward Michael Ward (chargé d'affaires)
1823–1824: Sir Edward Thornton

Ambassador Extraordinary and Plenipotentiary
1824–1827: Sir William à Court
1827–1828: Sir Frederick Lamb
1828–1833: Diplomatic relations severed after accession of King Miguel

Envoy Extraordinary and Minister Plenipotentiary
1833–1846: Lord Howard de Walden
1846–1851: Sir George Seymour
1851–1855: Sir Richard Pakenham
1855–1859: Henry Howard
1859–1866: Sir Arthur Magenis
1866–1867: Sir Augustus Paget
September–December 1867: Edward Thornton
1867–1874: Sir Charles Murray
1874–1876: Robert Bulwer-Lytton
1876–1881: Robert Morier
1881–1884: Sir Charles Wyke
1884–1892: George Petre
1893–1902: Sir Hugh MacDonell
1902–1905: Sir Martin Gosselin
1905–1911: Sir Francis Villiers
1911–1913: Sir Arthur Hardinge
1913–1924: Sir Lancelot Carnegie

Ambassador Extraordinary and Plenipotentiary
1924–1928: Sir Lancelot Carnegie
1928–1929: Sir Colville Barclay
1929–1931: Sir Francis Lindley
1931–1935: Sir Claud Russell
1935–1937: Sir Charles Wingfield
1937–1940: Sir Walford Selby
1940–1945: Sir Ronald Campbell
1945–1947: Sir Owen St.Clair O'Malley
1947–1955: Sir Nigel Ronald
1955–1961: Sir Charles Stirling
1961–1966: Sir Archibald Ross
1966–1970: Sir Anthony Lambert
1970–1974: Sir David Muirhead
1974–1976: Sir Nigel Trench
1976–1981: Sir John Moran (Lord Moran from 1977)
1981–1986: Sir Hugh Campbell Byatt (son of Sir Horace Archer Byatt)
1986–1989: Sir Michael Simpson-Orlebar
1989–1993: Hugh James Arbuthnott
1993–1995: Sir Stephen Wall
1995–1999: Roger Westbrook
1999–2001: Sir John Holmes
2001–2004: Dame Glynne Evans
2004–2007: John Buck
2007–2011: Alexander Ellis
2011–2014: Jill Gallard
2014–2018: Kirsty Hayes

2018–: Chris Sainty

External links
UK and Portugal, gov.uk

References

Portugal
 
United Kingdom